Consumed is an English punk rock band formed in 1992 in the outskirts of Nottingham. It was signed to Fat Wreck Chords, then moved to BYO Records and Golf Records shortly before the release of the album Pistols at Dawn. The band toured the UK, Europe, Scandinavia, the U.S. and Canada and also appeared regularly at surf and skate festivals in the mid-to late-1990s.

The band's first incarnation was called Desecrator (formed in 1989) which played death metal and released one album in 1991, titled Subconscious Release. 

The track "Heavy Metal Winner" was used in the 2000 video game Tony Hawk's Pro Skater 2 and in the HD version, Tony Hawk's Pro Skater HD, in 2012. It was added to the 2020 remake Tony Hawk's Pro Skater 1+2. It was also used in 2002 video game Totaled!.

The band broke up in 2003 but reformed in 2015 and is currently active. Consumed released a video for the track "What Would Cliff Burton Do?" in May 2018. The band's EP, A Decade of No, was released in July 2018 by SBÄM records in Europe and Umlaut Records in the UK.

Members

Current
Steve Ford – guitar, vocals (1994–2003; 2015–present)
Will Burchell – guitar, vocals (2000–2003; 2015–present)
Wes Wasley – bass guitar, vocals (2000–2003; 2015–present)
Chris Billam – drums (1994–2003 2015–present)

Former
Baz Barrett – bass guitar (1996–2000)
Mike Ford – guitar, vocals (1994–2001)

Touring musicians
Steve Watson – bass guitar (1994–1996)
Luke Moss – bass guitar (2003)
Jay Chapman – bass guitar (1994)

Discography

Albums/EPs 
 Breakfast at Pappa's EP (1998) Fat Wreck Chords
 Hit for Six (1999) Fat Wreck Chords
 Pistols at Dawn (2002) Golf / BYO Records
 A Decade of No EP (2018) SBAM / Umlaut Records

Music videos
 "Wake Up with a Smile" (1999)
 "What Would Cliff Burton Do?" (2018)

Compilations 
 Don't Do It (1996) Spin Out Records
 Short Music for Short People (1999) Fat Wreck Chords
 Fat Music Vol. IV: Life in the Fat Lane (1999) Fat Wreck Chords
 Fat Music Vol. V: Live Fat, Die Young (2001) Fat Wreck Chords
 Greetings from the Welfare State BYO Records
 Deck Cheese, Volume 2 Deck Cheese Records

References

External links 
 

English punk rock groups
Fat Wreck Chords artists
Musical groups from Nottingham
BYO Records artists
Melodic hardcore groups